The AFC Women's Futsal Asian Cup, previously the AFC Women's Futsal Championship, is the premier national women's futsal competition of the Asian Football Confederation nations. Iran have won both editions held to date.

The first edition was held in Malaysia from 17 to 26 September 2015. The second edition was held in Thailand from 2 to 12 May 2018. The third edition was scheduled to be held in Kuwait in 2020 but was postponed due to the COVID-19 pandemic. From 2021, the tournament will be rebranded from the "AFC Women's Futsal Championship" to the "AFC Women's Futsal Asian Cup".

Results
Source:

Summaries

a.e.t.: after extra time
pen.: after penalty shoot-out

Notes:

2020 AFC Women's Futsal Championship in  Kuwait Was Cancelled due to COVID-19 pandemic in Asia.

Teams reaching the top four

* as hosts

Summary (2015-2018)

Participating nations
Legend:

 — Champions
 — Runners-up
 — Third place
 — Fourth place
QF — Quarter-finalists
GS — Group stage
q — Qualified for upcoming tournament
 ••  — Qualified but withdrew
 •  — Did not qualify
  ×   — Did not enter
  ×   — Withdrew / Banned / Entry not accepted by FIFA
     — Hosts
     — Not affiliated to FIFA

For each tournament, the number of teams in each finals tournament (in brackets) are shown:

Awards

Most valuable players

Top scorers

Fair play award

See also
AFC Futsal Asian Cup
AFC Futsal Club Championship

References

External links
, the-AFC.com

 
Futsal
Women's international futsal competitions
Futsal competitions in Asia
Asian championships
2015 establishments in Asia